The gray-footed spiny rat (Proechimys poliopus) is a species of rodent in the family Echimyidae. It is found in Colombia and Venezuela.

Phylogeny
Morphological characters and mitochondrial cytochrome b DNA sequences showed that P. poliopus belongs to the so-called trinitatus group of Proechimys species, and shares closer phylogenetic affinities with the other members of this clade: P. trinitatus, P. mincae, P. guairae, P. magdalenae, P. chrysaeolus, P. urichi, and P. hoplomyoides.

References

Proechimys
Mammals of Colombia
Mammals of Venezuela
Mammals described in 1914
Taxa named by Wilfred Hudson Osgood
Taxonomy articles created by Polbot
Taxobox binomials not recognized by IUCN